Thomas Flowers may refer to:

 Tommy Flowers (1905–1998), British engineer
 Thomas Flowers (cricketer, born 1988), English cricketer
 Thomas Flowers (cricketer, born 1868) (1868–1939), English cricketer and umpire
 Thomas Flowers (born 1967), vocalist and guitarist with Oleander